The men's team foil open at the 2012 Summer Paralympics in London took place on 8 September 2012 at ExCeL Exhibition Centre.

Schedule 
All times are British Summer Time (UTC+1)

Competition format 
The tournament ran in a knockout format. Teams progressed through the draw until the finals, which decided the winners of the gold medal.

Results

External links 
 Wheelchair Fencing - Schedule & Results 
 Men's Team - Category Open 

Wheelchair fencing at the 2012 Summer Paralympics